Mohammad Nasiri Seresht (born 31 July 1945) is a retired Iranian weightlifter. He competed at the 1964, 1968, 1972 and 1976 Olympics and won a gold, a silver and a bronze medal. He also won gold medals at the Asian Games in 1966, 1970 and 1974 and at the world championships in 1968-70 and 1973-74, placing second in 1972 and third in 1966, 1971 and 1976. Between 1966 and 1973 he set 15 ratified world records: 10 in clean and jerk, 3 in the press and 2 in the total. In 1995 he was inducted into the International Weightlifting Federation Hall of Fame.

Nasiri took up weightlifting aged 13. He mostly competed in the 56 kg category, but for the 1973 World Championships in Havana he lowered his body weight to 52 kg, and even shaved his head for that. In Havana he set four world records within one day. He stayed in the 52 kg division for the rest of his career.

World championships

 Olympic Games 1968, 1972 and 1976 counted as World Championships too.
 No medals for individual lifts before 1969.
 Press was removed from Olympic weightlifting after 1972.

Olympics

References 

1945 births
Living people
World Weightlifting Championships medalists
Iranian male weightlifters
Iranian strength athletes
Olympic weightlifters of Iran
Olympic gold medalists for Iran
Olympic silver medalists for Iran
Olympic bronze medalists for Iran
Weightlifters at the 1964 Summer Olympics
Weightlifters at the 1968 Summer Olympics
Weightlifters at the 1972 Summer Olympics
Weightlifters at the 1976 Summer Olympics
Asian Games gold medalists for Iran
Asian Games silver medalists for Iran
Olympic medalists in weightlifting
Asian Games medalists in weightlifting
Weightlifters at the 1966 Asian Games
Weightlifters at the 1970 Asian Games
Weightlifters at the 1974 Asian Games
Medalists at the 1976 Summer Olympics
Medalists at the 1972 Summer Olympics
Medalists at the 1968 Summer Olympics
Medalists at the 1966 Asian Games
Medalists at the 1970 Asian Games
Medalists at the 1974 Asian Games
20th-century Iranian people
21st-century Iranian people